Epifanio "Epi" Jiménez Cruz (born June 11, 1965) in Carolina, Puerto Rico is a Puerto Rican politician who held many occupations in the New Progressive Party and was elected to a seat at 40th district in the Puerto Rico House of Representatives. Served as an officer in the Army National Guard of Puerto Rico.

Early years and studies
Epifanio Jiménez Cruz is the son of Epifanio Jiménez Meléndez and Miriam Cruz Rodríguez. He had primary and secondary studies at Colegio La Piedad in Isla Verde, Puerto Rico until he graduated. Later he went to the University of Puerto Rico where he earned a bachelor's degree in commerce with a concentration in Human Resources. Jiménez also enrolled in the Army Reserve Officers Training Corps Program ROTC where in 1988 he commissioned as a 2nd lieutenant and joined the Puerto Rico Army National Guard. Epifanio Jiménez retired from the Puerto Rico National Guard in 2015 rank of Lieutenant Colonel and continues to work on the logistics branch at the National Guard of Puerto Rico.

Political career
In 1984 he began a political career as an electoral worker and president of the New Progressive Party municipal youth committee in Carolina, Puerto Rico. In 1994 Epifanio Jiménez was an aide of Senator Charlie Rodriguez and ran in a special election where he succeeded to become the Representative for the 39th district in the Puerto Rico House of Representatives. Jiménez was reelected in the 1996, 2000 and 2004 general elections. In 2004 the 39 district became the 40th district. From 2004 to 2008 Jiménez was the Speaker pro tempore of the House of Representatives of Puerto Rico. In 2008, Jiménez ran for Mayor of Carolina, Puerto Rico. The standing mayor, José Aponte Dalmau from the Popular Democratic Party, was able to keep his position.

Military awards and decorations

Personal life 
He is married to Elizabeth Gallo (since 1988) and has 3 children Epifanio, Gian Carlo and Gabriel. He still lives in Carolina, Puerto Rico.

References

1965 births
Living people
People from Carolina, Puerto Rico
National Guard (United States) officers
New Progressive Party (Puerto Rico) politicians
Puerto Rican military officers
Puerto Rico National Guard personnel
Recipients of the Meritorious Service Medal (United States)
University of Puerto Rico alumni